The 10.5 cm leFH 18M ( "light field howitzer") was a German light howitzer used in the Second World War. The gun, less the carriage and shield, was also used as the armament of the Sd.Kfz. 124 Wespe self-propelled artillery vehicle. It was an improved version of the 10.5cm leFH 18 howitzer that offered superior range.

History
The 10.5 cm leFH 18M superseded the 10.5 cm leFH 18 as the standard German divisional field howitzer used during the Second World War. It was designed and developed by Rheinmetall after the war broke out in an effort to get more range from the basic leFH 18 design. A muzzle brake was fitted and the recoil system adjusted to allow the use of a more powerful charge and new long-range shell. Generally it did not equip independent artillery battalions until after the Battle of Stalingrad in 1943. 53 were also exported to Finland, where they were known as 105 H 33.

The 10.5 cm leFH 18M was also in service with the Syrian Army, one example being preserved in the Military Museum in Damascus. The type has seen occasional service with rebel groups during the Syrian Civil War, in July 2013 and May 2015.

Description
Many were converted from the 10.5 cm leFH 18 and retained their original wood-spoked or pressed steel wheels. The former were only suitable for horse traction.  Initially, it was fitted with a single-baffle muzzle brake of relatively low efficiency. This was later improved by welding two protruding ears to the rear of the port. However this style of muzzle brake proved troublesome with the early designs of high velocity anti-tank shells and a new cage-type muzzle brake was designed and fitted.

The new FH Gr Fern long-range shell was about  longer than the normal shells used by the leFH 18 guns, but had a shorter streamlined section behind the driving band to accommodate the larger powder charge required. This fit in the standard cartridge case, but protruded about  past its mouth.

Ballistically, the 10.5 cm leFH 18M and the leFH 18/40 are identical.

See also
 10.5 cm leFH 16, a field howitzer used by Germany in World War I and World War II
 10.5 cm leFH 18, previous version of the leFH 18/M
 10.5 cm leFH 18/40, a light howitzer mounted on a 7.5 cm PaK 40 antitank gun carriage, used by Germany in World War II
 Wespe, a self-propelled gun based on a leFH 18/M mounted on a modified Panzer II chassis, used by Germany in World War II

Notes

Sources
 Engelmann, Joachim and Scheibert, Horst. Deutsche Artillerie 1934-1945: Eine Dokumentation in Text, Skizzen und Bildern: Ausrüstung, Gliederung, Ausbildung, Führung, Einsatz. Limburg/Lahn, Germany: C. A. Starke, 1974
 Gander, Terry and Chamberlain, Peter. Weapons of the Third Reich: An Encyclopedic Survey of All Small Arms, Artillery and Special Weapons of the German Land Forces 1939-1945. New York: Doubleday, 1979 
 Hogg, Ian V. German Artillery of World War Two. 2nd corrected edition. Mechanicsville, PA: Stackpole Books, 1997 

World War II artillery of Germany
World War II field artillery
105 mm artillery
Rheinmetall
World War II howitzers
Weapons and ammunition introduced in 1941